Magic Waltz is a 1918 Hungarian film directed by Michael Curtiz.

External links

1918 films
Films directed by Michael Curtiz
Hungarian black-and-white films
Hungarian silent films
Films based on operettas